Pearl Marguerite Hyde  (1904-1963, née Bigby) was an English local politician and the first female Lord Mayor of Coventry.

Personal life

She was born in North London to Harman and Ellen Bigby, in 1904. Her father was landlord of the Vine Inn in Waltham Cross at the time of his death in a motor accident when she was 13: her mother had died five years earlier. She moved to Birmingham to live with a married older brother and an uncle, and then in 1920 moved to Coventry, to the White Lion Inn at 50-51 Smithford Street run by a family friend J Haines, where she learned the licensed trade. She married Walter Eric Hyde in 1923 and they had one son, Eric. She died on 15 April 1963 while on holiday in Scotland when a car she was driving collided with a lorry.

Political career
Hyde joined the Labour party in 1931, and was elected to Coventry Council for the Walsgrave ward in 1937, after standing for election unsuccessfully three times in the Westwood ward. She became an alderman in 1952 and the city's first female lord mayor in 1957, with her daughter-in-law Elizabeth Hyde as her lady mayoress.

Voluntary work
Hyde was leader of Coventry's Women's Voluntary Services based at Drapers Hall on Bailey Lane during World War II, and afterwards until 1958. Her work mostly involved providing sustenance through mobile canteens or restaurants, but other tasks such as distributing clothing and Red Cross parcels.  She was appointed a Member of the Order of the British Empire (MBE) for her services during the Coventry Blitz of 1940 and received a diploma from Charles De Gaulle in 1949 for her war work.  She appears in Humphrey Jennings' 1941 documentary The Heart of Britain, saying "You know you feel such fools standing there in a crater with a mug of tea … until a man says 'it washed the blood and dust from my mouth' and you know you really have done something useful".

Other work
From 1943 to 1959 Hyde worked as welfare officer at Lea Francis Cars, and from 1960 as a public relations executive with ATV.

Legacy
Hyde is remembered in the name of Pearl Hyde Primary School in Coventry.

In 2015 the Coventry Telegraph named Hyde as one of "50 heroes of Coventry and Warwickshire" alongside William Shakespeare, Lady Godiva and Ken Loach.

A portrait of her by William Dring is in the collection of the Herbert Art Gallery and Museum in Coventry.

A 48-minute archive film of Hyde's mayoral year is catalogued at the Media Archive for Central England: although the video is unavailable , the listing of contents indicates the breadth of Hyde's activities that year.

References

Further reading

1904 births
1963 deaths
Mayors of Coventry
Women mayors of places in England
Members of the Order of the British Empire
Women councillors in England